"Don't You" is a song written by Otha Young and Johnny Pierce and recorded by American country music group The Forester Sisters.  It was released in June 1989 as the first single from their Greatest Hits compilation album.  The song reached number 9 on the Billboard Hot Country Singles & Tracks chart.

Chart performance

Year-end charts

References

1989 singles
The Forester Sisters songs
Songs written by Otha Young
Warner Records singles
1989 songs